The Challenge is an American reality television show, which was spun off from the reality shows The Real World and Road Rules. Contestants compete against one another individually, in pairs, or in teams to win cash prizes. First airing in 1998, there have been a total of 38 seasons aired and the show has been filmed on six different continents. The Challenge airs on MTV and is hosted by T. J. Lavin.

Contestants on the show are a combination of alumni from seasons of various reality televisions shows, including The Real World, Road Rules, Are You the One?, Big Brother, and Ex on the Beach, along with contestants who debuted directly on The Challenge with one of its two Fresh Meat seasons or the Battle of the Bloodlines season. Prior to the twelfth season, Fresh Meat, contestants had only been from The Real World and Road Rules. The 26th season, was the first to feature contestants from Are You the One? The 31st season, was the first to feature contestants from Big Brother, Ex on the Beach, and Geordie Shore. There has also been one contestant who originated from a special mini-series that aired during MTV's Spring Break programming block in 2010, titled Spring Break Challenge. Contestants are regularly brought back for multiple seasons and use their veteran status along with relationships with other returnees to their advantage.

Contestants

Seasons 1-10

Seasons 11-20

Seasons 21-30

Seasons 31-present 

Table key
 Key:  = Contestant's first appearance on a season of The Challenge.

See also
 List of The Real World cast members

References
General

 
 Real World/Road Rules Challenge
 
 
 
 

 
 
 Gauntlet 2
 
 
 
 
 

 

<li>

Citations

Challenge (TV series) contestants, The